The Norwegian Crusade, led by Norwegian King Sigurd I, was a crusade or a pilgrimage (sources differ) that lasted from 1107 to 1111, in the aftermath of the First Crusade. The Norwegian Crusade marks the first time a European king personally went to the Holy Land.

The journey to Jerusalem

From Norway to England (1107–08)

Sigurd and his men sailed from Norway in the autumn of 1107 with sixty ships and perhaps around 5,000 men. In the autumn he arrived in England, where Henry I was king. Sigurd and his men stayed there the entire winter, until the spring of 1108, when they set sail southwards.

In mainland Iberia (1108–09)
After several months they came to the town of Santiago de Compostela (Jakobsland) in Galicia (Galizuland) where they were allowed by a local lord to stay for the winter. However, when the winter came there was a shortage of food, which caused the lord to refuse to sell food and goods to the Norwegians. Sigurd gathered his army, attacked the lord's castle and looted what they could there. The identity of the local lord or count is uncertain.

In the spring they continued along the coast of Portugal, capturing eight Saracen galleys on their way, and conquered a castle at Sintra (probably referring to Colares, which is closer to the sea), after which they continued to Lisbon, a "half Christian and half heathen" city, said to be on the dividing line between Christian and Muslim Iberia, where they won another battle. On their continued journey they sacked the town of Alkasse (probably Alcácer do Sal), and on their way into the Mediterranean, near the Strait of Gibraltar (Norfasund), met and defeated a Muslim squadron.

In the Balearics (1109)
After entering the Mediterranean (Griklands haf) they sailed along the coast of the land of the Saracens (Serkland) to the Balearic Islands. The Balearics were at the time perceived by Christians to be nothing more than a pirate haven and slaving centre. The Norwegian raids are also the first recorded Christian attacks on the Islamic Balearic Islands (though smaller attacks certainly had occurred).

The first place they arrived at was Formentera, where they encountered a great number of blámenn (blue men) and Serkir (Saracens) who had taken up their dwelling in a cave. The course of the fight is the most detailed of the entire crusade through written sources. After this battle, the Norwegians supposedly acquired the greatest treasures they had ever acquired. They then went on to successfully attack Ibiza and Menorca. The Norwegians seem to have avoided attacking the largest of the Balearic Islands, Majorca, most likely because it was at the time the most prosperous and well-fortified centre of an independent taifa kingdom. Tales of their success may have inspired the Catalan–Pisan conquest of the Balearics in 1113–1115.

In Sicily (1109–10)
In the Spring of 1109, they arrived at Sicily (Sikiley), where they were welcomed by the ruling Count Roger II, who was 12–13 years old at the time.

Kingdom of Jerusalem (1110)

In the summer of 1110, they arrived at the port of Acre (Akrsborg) (or perhaps in Jaffa), and went to Jerusalem (Jórsalir), where they met the ruling crusader king Baldwin I. They were warmly welcomed, and Baldwin rode together with Sigurd to the river Jordan, and back again to Jerusalem.

The Norwegians were given many treasures and relics, including a splinter off the True Cross that Jesus had allegedly been crucified on. This was given on the condition that they would continue to promote Christianity and bring the relic to the burial site of St Olaf.

Siege of Sidon (1110)

Later, Sigurd returned to his ships at Acre, and when Baldwin was going to the Muslim town of Sidon (Sætt) in Syria (Sýrland), Sigurd and his men accompanied him in the siege. The siege resulted in Sidon being taken and the subsequent creation of the Lordship of Sidon.

The journey back to Norway
After this, Sigurd and his men sailed to Constantinople, where Sigurd left all of his ships and valuable figureheads, and many of his men, and then made his way back to Norway by land, arriving there in 1111.

Notes

References

Bibliography
Bergan, Halvor (2005) Kong Sigurds Jorsalferd. Den unge kongen som ble Norges helt (Norgesforlaget) 
Morten, Øystein (2014) Jakten på Sigurd Jorsalfare (Spartacus) 

Riant, Paul (1865–1869). Expéditions et pèlerinages des Scandinaves en Terre sainte au temps des croisades, 2 volumes (1865–1869). Chapter IV: Croisade de Sigurd I, pp. 173–215.
Sigurd Magnússon. In Independent Crusaders Project, Fordham University (2021).

External links

 
Wars involving Norway
1100s conflicts
Conflicts in 1110
Military history of Ibiza
History of Menorca
Formentera
Wars involving the Fatimid Caliphate
Wars involving the Republic of Venice
Alcácer do Sal
1110s in the Kingdom of Jerusalem
1110 in Asia